The Central Warehouse is a warehouse located at 1800 North Michigan in Saginaw, Michigan. It was listed on the National Register of Historic Places in 1982.

History
The Central Warehouse Company was organized in 1910 by William Carr, a local feed and grain dealer, and ten other businessmen from within the community. The company hired local architect Frederick Beckbissinger to design a storage building. Several local firms were hired to provide materials for and construct the building, including Spence Brothers, who did the general contracting. Central Warehouse opened in 1913, with its first customers primarily firms related to the production and distribution of farm equipment. Two of the largest Central Warehouse customers were John Deere and International Harvester. International Harvester used the warehouse until the mid-1920s, while John Deere used it until the 1940s. The building continues to be used as a warehouse.

Description
The Central Warehouse is a simple functional Chicago-style warehouse, constructed of brick with limestone stringcourses above the first and fourth floor levels. It has a  dentilated limestone bandcourse at its cornice and a stepped pediment at the roofline.

References

		
National Register of Historic Places in Saginaw County, Michigan
Chicago school architecture in Michigan
Buildings and structures completed in 1913